Edmund Burke is a bronze full length statue of Irish statesman, author, orator, political theorist and philosopher Edmund Burke by British artist James Havard Thomas. The original is in Bristol, England, with a second cast on Massachusetts Avenue at 11th and "L" Streets, NW, in Washington, D.C., United States.

Description

The full length sculpture of Burke depicts him stepping forward with his right leg. He is waving his right hand, and in his left hand he holds a three-cornered hat at his side. He wears a long jacket, a vest, and breeches. His hair curls up just above his ears and is parted down the middle.

About the Washington DC statue
The sculpture sits upon a rectangular granite base (H. 72 in. x 92 in.). The sculpture is signed: I. HAVARD THOMAS FECIT MDCCCXCIV CAST Á CIRE PERDVE H.H. MARTYN & Co. Ltd. Cheltenham 1922.

The front (east) side of the base is inscribed with:

The west side of the base is inscribed with:

The Washington, D.C., sculpture is a cast of the original which is on display in Bristol, England. Cast by H.H. Martyn & Company, the sculpture was presented to the United States by Sir Charles Cheers Wakefield, former Lord Mayor of London. It was dedicated on October 12, 1922.

In September 1922, Frederick D. Owen built a temporary base for the sculpture, which was moved during courthouse renovations in 1922–1923. The permanent base, built in June 1923, was built by Horace W. Peaslee, with stonework by New England Granite Works.

As part of American Revolution Statuary in Washington, D.C. the statue has been listed on the National Register of Historic Places since July 1978.

Edmund Burke was surveyed by the Smithsonian's Save Outdoor Sculpture! survey in May 1993 for its condition and was described as "well maintained."

Gallery

See also
 List of public art in Washington, D.C., Ward 2

References

External links

Revisiting the Edmund Burke Monument on DCist.
The statue on dcMemorials.com

1922 sculptures
American Revolution Statuary
Bronze sculptures in Washington, D.C.
Historic district contributing properties in Washington, D.C.
Monuments and memorials on the National Register of Historic Places in Washington, D.C.
Outdoor sculptures in Washington, D.C.
Sculptures of men in Washington, D.C.
Statues in Washington, D.C.
Edmund Burke
Northwest (Washington, D.C.)